John Joseph Pappalau (April 3, 1875 – May 12, 1944) was a pitcher in Major League Baseball. He played for the Cleveland Spiders in 1897.

References

External links

1875 births
1944 deaths
19th-century baseball players
Major League Baseball pitchers
Cleveland Spiders players
Johnstown Buckskins players
Pittsfield Colts players
Grand Rapids Bob-o-links players
Milwaukee Brewers (minor league) players
Milwaukee Creams players
Springfield Ponies players
Springfield Maroons players
New Haven Blues players
Worcester Quakers players
Worcester Hustlers players
Toronto Maple Leafs (International League) players
Montreal Royals players
Worcester Riddlers players
Rochester Bronchos players
Binghamton Bingoes players
Troy Trojans (minor league) players
Albany Senators players
Holy Cross Crusaders baseball coaches
Sportspeople from Albany, New York
Baseball players from New York (state)
Burials at Albany Rural Cemetery